Om Jong-guk (born 25 November 1943) is a North Korean weightlifter. He competed in the men's featherweight event at the 1976 Summer Olympics.

References

1943 births
Living people
North Korean male weightlifters
Olympic weightlifters of North Korea
Weightlifters at the 1976 Summer Olympics
Place of birth missing (living people)
Medalists at the 1974 Asian Games
Asian Games silver medalists for North Korea
Weightlifters at the 1974 Asian Games
Asian Games medalists in weightlifting
21st-century North Korean people
20th-century North Korean people